The Our Lady of Exile and St. Catherine of Alexandria Cathedral Also Florianópolis Cathedral It is a Catholic church dedicated to Our Lady of the Exile, which functions as the cathedral of the archdiocese of Florianópolis, since its creation on March 19, 1908. The building is protected by the National Historical and Artistic Heritage Institute of Brazil.

The definitive colonization of Florianópolis began in 1673. In 1679, Francisco Dias Velho required the legal title of the lands, beginning the construction of a church dedicated to the Virgin Mary. It was small and built with limestone. Inside it, the founder of Desterro (today Florianópolis) was assassinated. In 1908 it was elevated to the condition of Cathedral.

See also
Roman Catholicism in Brazil
St. Catherine of Alexandria

References

Roman Catholic cathedrals in Santa Catarina (state)